Mathias E. Glomnes (2 February 1869 – 5 June 1956) was a Norwegian sport shooter who competed in the 1908 Summer Olympics and in the 1912 Summer Olympics.

In 1908 he finished sixth with the Norwegian team in the team military rifle event. In the 1000 yard free rifle competition as well as in the 300 metre free rifle event he finished 47th. Four years later he finished again sixth with the Norwegian team in the team military rifle event. In the 300 metre military rifle, three positions competition he finished 35th.

References

External links
list of Norwegian sport shooters

1869 births
1956 deaths
Norwegian male sport shooters
ISSF rifle shooters
Olympic shooters of Norway
Shooters at the 1908 Summer Olympics
Shooters at the 1912 Summer Olympics
20th-century Norwegian people